Alexandre Bisson (9 April 1848 – 27 January 1912) was a French playwright, vaudeville creator, and novelist. Born in Briouze, Orne in Lower Normandy, he was successful in his native France as well as in the United States.  Remembered as a significant creator of Parisian vaudeville, in collaboration with Edmond Gondinet, Bisson's 1881 three-act comedy Un Voyage d'agrément was performed at the Théâtre du Vaudeville in Paris. 

Of his works, Bisson is best remembered for his play Madame X, which was performed in 1910 both in Paris and on Broadway with Sarah Bernhardt in the leading role. Over the years, the play would be revived for Broadway three times and nine Madame X motion pictures in several languages have been filmed. The first silent screen adaptation was in 1916 and the latest in 2000. Better-known versions include a 1929 sound film starring Ruth Chatterton and directed by Lionel Barrymore plus the 1966 film starring Lana Turner. In 2006, a musical based on the original play was produced in Chicago.

Bisson also adapted the 1910 best-selling Florence Barclay novel, The Rosary as a three-act play for the Paris stage. Widely acclaimed in the United States, Alexandre Bisson was invited to write about the theatre by The Saturday Evening Post and his articles "The Dilemmas of the Theater" and "How the World Contributes to the American Stage" were published in 1912.

Alexandre Bisson died in Paris in 1912 at the age of 63.

Selected works for stage
 1882: 115, Rue Pigalle
 1884: Le Député de Bombignac (Comédie-Française, 28 May 1884)
 1886: Une Mission délicate
 1886: Un Conseil judiciaire
 1887: Ma gouvernante
 1888: Les Surprises du divorce (with Antony Mars)
 1893: Le Veglione (le Bal masqué)) (with Albert Carré)
 1895: Monsieur le Directeur ! (with Fabrice Carré)
 1896: Disparu !
 1897: Jalouse
 1897: La famille Pont-Biquet
 1898: Feu Toupinel (adapted by William Gillette as Mr. Wilkinson's Widows)
 1898: Le Contrôleur des wagons-lits
 1900: Château historique !
 1901: Le Bon juge
 1907: Les Plumes du paon
 1908: Madame X
 1910: Nick Carter vs. Fantômas (with Guillaume Livet) (translated )

Filmography

Madame X Adaptations 
Madame X, directed by George F. Marion (1916), starring Dorothy Donnelly as Jacqueline Floriot
A névtelen asszony, directed by Jenő Janovics (Austria-Hungary, 1918), starring Emília Márkus as Jacqueline Fleuriot
Madame X, directed by Frank Lloyd (1920), starring Pauline Frederick as Jacqueline Fleuriot
Madame X, directed by Lionel Barrymore (1929), starring Ruth Chatterton as Jacqueline Fleuriot
, directed by Carlos F. Borcosque (Spanish-language, 1931), starring  as Jaquelina
Madame X, directed by Sam Wood (1937), starring Gladys George as Jacqueline Fleuriot
The Trial of Madame X, directed by Paul England (UK, 1948), starring Mara Russell-Tavernan as Jacqueline
Madame X, directed by Artemio B. Tecson (Philippines, 1952), starring Alicia Vergel
Madame X, directed by Orestis Laskos (Greece, 1954), starring Cybele as Lina Flerianos
Madame X, directed by Julián Soler (Mexico, 1955), starring Libertad Lamarque as Adriana
The Unknown Woman, directed by Mahmoud Zulfikar (Egypt, 1959), starring Shadia
Madame X, directed by David Lowell Rich (1966), starring Lana Turner as Holly Parker
Madame X, directed by Robert Ellis Miller (1981, TV film), starring Tuesday Weld as Holly Richardson

Other Adaptations 
, directed by Georges Monca (France, 1912, short film, based on the play Les Surprises du divorce)
Le Contrôleur des wagons-lits, directed by Georges Monca (France, 1913, short film, based on the play Le Contrôleur des wagons-lits)
Le Bon Juge, directed by Georges Monca (France, 1913, short film, based on the play Le Bon Juge)
Monsieur le directeur, directed by Georges Monca (France, 1913, short film, based on the play Monsieur le directeur)
Le Roi Koko, directed by Georges Monca (France, 1913, short film, based on the play Le Roi Koko)
Her Beloved Villain, directed by Sam Wood (1920, based on the play Le Veglione ou le Bal masqué)
, directed by Mario Almirante (Italy, 1922, based on the play Le Contrôleur des wagons-lits)
, directed by Guido Brignone (Italy, 1923, based on the play Les Surprises du divorce)
, directed by Henri Desfontaines (France, 1924, based on the play Château historique)
, directed by Jean Kemm (France, 1933, based on the play Les Surprises du divorce)
, directed by Roger Capellani (France, 1934, based on the play Feu Toupinel)
Der Schlafwagenkontrolleur, directed by Richard Eichberg (Germany, 1935, based on the play Le Contrôleur des wagons-lits)
, directed by Richard Eichberg (France, 1935, based on the play Le Contrôleur des wagons-lits)
, directed by Christian-Jaque (France, 1935, based on the play La Famille Pont-Biquet)
, directed by Henri Chomette (France, 1938, based on the play Jalouse)
, directed by Guido Brignone (Italy, 1939, based on the play Les Surprises du divorce)
, directed by Luis Bayón Herrera (Argentina, 1940)
, directed by Gilles Grangier (France, 1950, based on the play Château historique)

References

External links 

1848 births
1912 deaths
People from Orne
19th-century French dramatists and playwrights
19th-century French novelists
20th-century French novelists
20th-century French male writers
French male novelists
19th-century French male writers